Esther Schop (born 22 January 1990) is a former Dutch handball player, who last played for Le Havre until 2018 and the Dutch national team.

References

1990 births
Living people
Dutch female handball players
Sportspeople from Alkmaar
Dutch expatriate sportspeople in France
21st-century Dutch women